

Champions

Major League Baseball
World Series: Detroit Tigers over Chicago Cubs (4–2)
All-Star Game, July 8 at Municipal Stadium: American League, 4–1

Other champions
Negro League Baseball All-Star Game, August 11 at Comiskey Park: West, 11–8 (11 innings)
Central American and Caribbean Games: Cuba

Awards and honors
Most Valuable Player
Hank Greenberg, Detroit Tigers (AL)
Gabby Hartnett, Chicago Cubs (NL)

MLB statistical leaders

Major league baseball final standings

American League final standings

National League final standings

Negro leagues final standings

Negro National League final standings

*Source refers to the league as the "East-West League", but the league was more generally known as the "Negro National League."

Source:  

Post-season:
Pittsburgh won one half, New York won one half.
Pittsburgh beat New York 5 games to 2 games in a play-off.

Events

January–May
January 19 – The St. Louis Browns trade Bump Hadley to the Washington Senators for Luke Sewell and cash, then sell Sewell's contract to the Chicago White Sox.
February 26 – The New York Yankees release Babe Ruth. Later the same day, the Boston Braves sign him.
April 1 – Dazzy Vance joins the Brooklyn Dodgers.
April 15 – Johnny Mize, who originally signed with the St. Louis Cardinals, but was sold to the Cincinnati Reds on December 13, is returned to the Cards.
April 16 – Opening day, Lefty Gomez holds the New York Yankees to just two hits as the Boston Red Sox win their season opener 1–0 at Yankee Stadium. In the National League, both the Pittsburgh Pirates and Brooklyn Dodgers put up twelve runs in victories over the Cincinnati Reds and Philadelphia Phillies, respectively.
April 18 – Detroit Tigers leadoff hitter Jo-Jo White draws five walks in the Tigers' 5–4 victory over the Chicago White Sox.
April 21
The Cleveland Indians open their season with three consecutive extra innings games, amassing 41 total innings.
After ten innings, the contest between the Philadelphia Phillies and New York Giants at the Baker Bowl is called a 4–4 tie. The Phillies tie an NL record by turning six double plays, with Phillies shortstop Blondy Ryan tying the individual mark by being part of five of the double plays.
May 8 – In the first game of a double header with the Philadelphia Phillies, Cincinnati Reds catcher Ernie Lombardi ties a Major League record by hitting four consecutive doubles en route to a 15–4 victory. Lombardi logs just one at-bat in the second game, and gets a single.
May 24 – At Crosley Field, the Cincinnati Reds and the visiting Philadelphia Phillies played the first night game, which Cincinnati won 2–1.  President Franklin D. Roosevelt turns on the lights with a switch in the White House.
May 25 – Babe Ruth of  goes 4-for-4 with three home runs and six runs batted in. It is the last multi-homer game of Ruth's career, with the final home run, the 714th of his career, being the first ball ever hit to clear the roof at Forbes Field in Pittsburgh.
May 30 – Babe Ruth ends his playing career with the Boston Braves.

June–September
June 26 – The Pittsburgh Pirates sweep a double header with the Boston Braves. Pirates centerfielder Lloyd Waner sets a Major League record with eighteen put outs.
July 7 – The Detroit Tigers complete a ten-game winning streak that pulls them within one game of the first place Yankees.
July 8 – At Cleveland Municipal Stadium, home of the Cleveland Indians, the American League defeats the National League, 4–1, in the All-Star Game.
July 19 – Casey Stengel's Brooklyn Dodgers end the St. Louis Cardinals' fourteen-game winning streak behind a shut out by Johnny Babich.
July 22 – With a 4–2 victory over the Cincinnati Reds, the Boston Braves end a fifteen-game losing streak.
July 23 – With first place in the American League on the line, the Detroit Tigers and New York Yankees split a double header. Detroit wins the following day, 4–0, to leave Detroit a half game up on the Yankees. They remain in first for the remainder of the season.
August 10 – The New York Yankees defeat the Philadelphia A's, 18–7. Right fielder George Selkirk hits two home runs and drives in eight.
August 16 – Dizzy Dean and Hal Schumacher engage in a pitchers' duel at the Polo Grounds. Schumaker's Giants emerge with the 1–0 victory.
August 27 – In the first game of a double header at Comiskey Park with the Chicago White Sox, Lou Gehrig goes three-for-five with two RBIs and two runs scored to lead the Yankees to a 13–10 victory. In the second game, Gehrig is walked five times. Chicago wins that game, 4–3.
August 31 – Vern Kennedy pitches a no-hitter as the Chicago White Sox defeat the Cleveland Indians, 5–0. It is the first no-hitter in the American League since , and the first ever at Chicago's Comiskey Park.
September 12 – The Philadelphia Athletics sweep a double header from the Chicago White Sox to end a thirteen-game losing streak.
September 27 – The first place Chicago Cubs sweep a double header with the St. Louis Cardinals that brings their winning streak to 21 games. The Cubs were in third place, 2.5 games back of the Cards, when the streak began.

October–December
October 2 – Schoolboy Rowe pitched effectively, however, his fielding error lead to two unearned runs in the first inning as the Chicago Cubs take game one of the 1935 World Series, 3–0.
October 3 – Hank Greenberg's two-run home run caps off a four-run first inning for the Tigers as Detroit takes game two of the World Series, 8–3. In the bottom of the seventh, Greenberg is hit by a pitch that ends his season.
October 4 – As part of a double switch, Freddie Lindstrom moves from centerfield to third base in the tenth inning of game three of the World Series. An inning later, he misplays Flea Clifton's ground ball to allow the Detroit Tigers to take the 6–5 victory.
October 5 – Gabby Hartnett hits a second-inning home run to put the Cubs on the board first, but the Tigers come back with two unanswered runs, and win 2–1.
October 7 – With the score tied at three, Stan Hack leads off the ninth inning for the Cubs with a triple. He is left stranded by Bill Jurges, Larry French and Augie Galan fail to drive him in. In the bottom of the inning, Goose Goslin singles in Mickey Cochrane to give the Detroit Tigers their first World Championship, four games to two. This was Detroit's first Series victory after failing to win four previous times. Cubs skipper Charlie Grimm is widely second-guessed for letting the pitcher bat in the top of the inning.
November 26 – The National League assumes control of the bankrupt, Boston Braves franchise after several failed attempts to buy the last-place club. The league takes over only temporarily, until matters can be straightened out.
December 9 – The New York Giants trade Roy Parmelee, Phil Weintraub and cash to the St. Louis Cardinals for Burgess Whitehead.
December 10 – The Boston Red Sox acquire Jimmie Foxx and Johnny Marcum from the Philadelphia Athletics for Gordon Rhodes, minor leaguer George Savino and $150,000.
December 12 – The Boston Braves trade Ed Brandt and Randy Moore to the Brooklyn Dodgers for Ray Benge, Tony Cuccinello, Al López and Bobby Reis. They also sell the contracts of Flint Rhem and Johnny Vander Meer to the Cincinnati Reds.
December 17 – The Boston Red Sox acquire Heinie Manush from the Washington Senators for Roy Johnson and Carl Reynolds.

Movies
Alibi Ike

Births

January
January 5 – Earl Battey
January 6 – Ed Bauta
January 7 – Dick Schofield
January 8 – Reno Bertoia
January 9 – Bob Duliba 
January 10 – Ted Bowsfield
January 17 – Dick Brown
January 19 – Fred Valentine
January 26 – Bob Uecker
January 27 – Steve Demeter

February
February 3 – Don Kaiser
February 3 – Dick Tracewski
February 10 – Sherman Jones
February 11 – George Alusik
February 17 – Whammy Douglas
February 19 – Russ Nixon
February 28 – Bill Haller

March
March 13 – Bill Dailey
March 13 – Joan LeQuia
March 19 – Fritz Brickell
March 22 – Gene Oliver
March 22 – Frank Pulli
March 28 – Jeanie Descombes
March 28 – Garland Shifflett

April
April 1 – Tom Qualters
April 8 – Dick Luebke
April 10 – Joe Gibbon
April 13 – Bill Deegan
April 14 – Gene Hayden
April 14 – Katie Horstman
April 19 – Don Gile
April 19 – Héctor Maestri
April 19 – John Wyatt
April 21 – Mack Burk
April 21 – Dolores Lee
April 23 – Ron Blackburn
April 26 – Nate Smith
April 28 – Bob Botz
April 28 – Pedro Ramos

May
May 5 – José Pagán
May 9 – Joe Shipley
May 12 – Felipe Alou
May 18 – Ken Hamlin
May 20 – Gloria McCloskey
May 22 – Ron Piché
May 26 – Eddie Haas
May 27 – Jerry Kindall
May 30 – Ed Rakow

June
June 1 – Hal Kolstad
June 1 – Jack Kralick
June 8 – George Brunet
June 12 – Bob Thorpe
June 14 – Neil Wilson
June 19 – Chet Boak
June 24 – Charlie Dees
June 25 – Don Demeter
June 28 – Bob Blaylock
June 29 – Katsuya Nomura, Japanese baseball player and manager
June 30 – Paul Toth

July
July 3 – Mutsuo Minagawa
July 12 – Dave Ricketts
July 14 – Earl Francis
July 15 – Donn Clendenon
July 15 – Bob Miller
July 19 – Nick Koback
July 21 – Moe Drabowsky
July 25 – Larry Sherry
July 26 – Buddy Gilbert
July 26 – Lou Jackson
July 27 – John Edelman
July 27 – Sarah Jane Sands
July 28 – Ernie Bowman
July 31 – Terry Fox

August
August 1 – Phyllis Bookout
August 12 – Ken McBride
August 13 – Mudcat Grant
August 15 – Joey Jay
August 18 – Bob Humphreys
August 19 – Bobby Richardson
August 26 – Al Silvera
August 27 – Ernie Broglio
August 30 – Frank Funk
August 31 – Frank Robinson

September
September 2 – Gordon Massa
September 2 – Don Williams
September 5 – Tom Patton
September 7 – Enrique Maroto
September 9 – Jim Proctor
September 17 – Tadashi Sugiura
September 18 – Jerry Mallett
September 26 – Walt Streuli
September 27 – Dave Wickersham
September 28 – Bob Dustal
September 29 – Bob Anderson
September 29 – Howie Bedell

October
October 12 – Tony Kubek
October 12 – Bobo Osborne
October 16 – Manny Montejo
October 18 – Howie Nunn
October 28 – Bob Veale
October 30 – Jim Perry

November
November 7 – Jay Hankins
November 9 – Bob Gibson
November 9 – Joan Kaufman
November 15 – Jack Smith
November 21 – Dick Bertell
November 25 – Jim Duffalo

December
December 2 – Harry Taylor
December 7 – Don Cardwell
December 13 – Joe Christopher
December 13 – Lindy McDaniel
December 17 – Cal Ripken Sr.
December 19 – Tony Taylor
December 25 – Joyce Steele
December 25 – Joanne Weaver
December 26 – Al Jackson
December 29 – Annie Gosbee
December 30 – Sandy Koufax

Deaths

January
January 14 – Irv Young, 57, pitcher for the Beaneaters, Doves, WhiteSox and Pirates in six seasons from 1905 to 1911, a 20-game winner in his rookie season, who twice led the National League in starts, complete games and innings pitched.
January 29 – Ed Murphy, 58, pitcher for the 1898 Philadelphia Phillies and for the St. Louis Cardinals from 1901 to 1903.

February
February 18 – Gene DeMontreville, 61, a .303 career hitter with the Senators, Beaneaters, Orioles, Orphans and Superbas from 1894 to 1904, who was able to play all positions except pitcher and catcher.
February 22 – Marsh Williams, 42, pitcher for the 1916 Philadelphia Athletics.
February 24 – Joe Moffet, 75, backup infielder/outfielder for the 1884 Toledo Blue Stockings of the American Association.
February 28 – Harry Schafer, 78, third baseman and outfielder who played from 1881 through 1888 for the Boston Red Stockings.

March
March 11 – George Rooks, 71, backup outfielder for the Boston Beaneaters during the 1891 season.
March 15 – Ed Fuller, 65, pitcher for the 1886 Washington Nationals.
March 16 – Oscar Streit, 61, pitcher for the Boston Beaneaters in 1899 and the Cleveland Bronchos in 1902.
March 20 – Bill Holbert, 80, catcher for the Louisville Grays, Milwaukee Grays, Syracuse Stars, Troy Trojans, New York Metropolitans and Brooklyn Bridegrooms in 12 seasons spanning 1876–1888, who holds the major league record for career at-bats without a home run, failing to do so in 2,335 batting appearances.
March 23 – John Flynn, 51, first baseman who played from 1910 through 1912 with the Pittsburgh Pirates and Washington Senators, also a minor league manager.
March 31 – Steve Libby, 81, first baseman who played for the Buffalo Bisons of the National League for one game during the 1879 season, and eventually served as an umpire in the league.

April
April 2 – Brad Hogg, 46, pitcher for the Boston Rustlers/Braves, Chicago Cubs and Philadelphia Phillies in five seasons spanning 1911–1919.
April 10 – Pat Hartnett, 71, first baseman for the 1890 St. Louis Browns of the National League.
April 11 – Charlie Gettig, 64, pitcher who played from 1896 through 1889 for the New York Giants.
April 14 – Doc Martin, 47, pitcher for the Philadelphia Athletics in a span of three years from 1908 to 1912.
April 19 – Jim Donahue, 73, catcher for New York Metropolitans, Kansas City Cowboys and Columbus Solons during five seasons spanning 1886–1891.
April 22 – Charlie Blackwell, 40, outfielder in the Negro leagues from 1915 to 1929.
April 22 – George Ross, 42, pitcher for the 1918 New York Giants.
April 23 – Swede Carlstrom, 47, shortstop for the Boston Red Sox in 1911.
April 26 – John Thornton, 65, pitcher the Washington Nationals in 1889 and the Philadelphia Phillies from 1891 to 1892, and later an outfielder for the 1892 St. Louis Browns.
April 28 – Dewey McDougal, 63, pitcher who played from 1895 to 1896 for the St. Louis Browns.

May
May 3 – Ted Breitenstein, 65, pitcher for the Browns, Reds and Cardinals from 1891 to 1901, whose 160 victories were the most by a 19th-century left-hander, who also hurled two no-hitters, twice led the National League in complete games, and collected three 20-win seasons.
May 4 – Dory Dean, 82, pitcher for the 1876 Cincinnati Reds.
May 7 – Sid Farrar, 75, infielder for the Philadelphia Quakers/Athletics from 1883 to 1890.
May 16 – Wallace Fessenden, 74, 19th century umpire and manager; umpired in 53 National League games from April 24, 1889 to July 2, 1890, then managed Syracuse of the then-major-league American Association from July 21 to August 3, 1890.
May 16 – Pete Weckbecker, 70, catcher who played from 1889 to 1890 for the Indianapolis Hoosiers and Louisville Colonels.
May 16 – Mark McGrillis, 62, third baseman who played for the 1892 St. Louis Browns of the National League.
May 22 – Luke Glavenich, 42, pitcher for the 1913 Cleveland Naps.
May 28 – Charlie Sullivan, 32, pitcher for the Detroit Tigers in part of three seasons spanning 1928–1931.
May 31 – Casey Patten, 61,  pitcher who posted a 105-128 and a 3.36 ERA with the Washington Senators and Boston Red Sox over parts of eight seasons from 1901 to 1908.

June
June   8 – Jay Parker, 60, pitcher for the 1899 Pittsburgh Pirates.
June 17 – Wiman Andrus, 76, who pitched in one game for the 1885 Providence Grays.
June 11 – Fred Abbott, 60, catcher who played from 1903 through 1905 with the Cleveland Naps and Philadelphia Phillies.
June 14 – Walt Kuhn, 48, catcher for the Chicago White Sox from 1912 to 1914.
June 25 – Jack O'Neill, 64, Irish-born catcher who played from 1902 to 1906 for the St. Louis Cardinals, Chicago Cubs and Boston Beaneaters; one of four brothers to play in the majors, including Steve O'Neill.

July
July 2 – Hank O'Day, 75, Hall of Fame umpire who officiated in the National League for 30 years between 1895 and 1927 and worked in ten World Series, previously a pitcher in the Players' League and a manager for the Reds and Cubs.
July 10 – Paul Hines, 83, outfielder/infielder and  one of the top stars in the early days of baseball, who is given credit for 13 firsts in Major League history, including the first unassisted triple play and the first Triple Crown, also a .302 hitter in 20 seasons from 1872 to 1891, while amassing more hits than any other player in the National League over its first five seasons.
July 18 – Tom Ryder, 72, backup outfielder for the St. Louis Maroons of the Union Association during the 1884 season.
July 24 – Billy Crowell, 49, pitcher who played from 1887 to 1888 for the Cleveland Blues and Louisville Colonels.
July 26 – Bill Whitrock, 65, pitcher for the St. Louis Browns, Louisville Colonels, Cincinnati Reds and Philadelphia Phillies in part of four seasons spanning 1890–1896.

August
August 11 – Jack Zalusky, 56, catcher for the 1903 New York Highlanders of the American League.
August 24 – George Keefe, 68, pitcher who played for the NL Washington Nationals, PL Buffalo Bisons and AA Washington Statesmen from 1886 to 1891.
August 30 – Leo Smith, 76, shortstop for the 1890 Rochester Broncos of the American Association.

September
September 3 – Mike Ryan, 67,  third baseman for the 1895 St. Louis Browns of the National League.
September 4 – Dan Cotter, 68, pitcher who played with the Buffalo Bisons of the Players' League in 1890.
September 10 – Pug Bennett, 61,  second baseman who played from 1906 to 1907 for the St. Louis Cardinals.
September 12 – Ed Beecher, 75, outfielder who played with the Pittsburgh Alleghenys, Washington Nationals, Buffalo Bisons, Washington Statesmen and Philadelphia Athletics in part of four seasons spanning 1897–1891.
September 15 – Joe Ardner, 77, second baseman who played for the Cleveland Blues in 1884 and the Cleveland Spiders in 1890.
September 17 – Len Koenecke, 31, outfielder who played for the New York Giants in 1932 and the Brooklyn Dodgers from 1934 to 1935; flying back to Brooklyn after being released by the Dodgers — and under the influence of alcohol — he was killed in self-defense by an airplane pilot whom he attacked in mid-air.
September 21 – Herm McFarland, 65, outfielder who played for the Louisville Colonels, Cincinnati Reds, Chicago White Sox, Baltimore Orioles and New York Highlanders in all or part of five seasons from 1896 to 1903.
September 21 – Henry Yaik, 71, catcher and outfielder who played with the Pittsburgh Alleghenys in the 1888 season.

October
October 11 – George Pierce, 47, pitcher who played from 1912 through 1917 for the Chicago Cubs and St. Louis Cardinals.
October 11 – Chick Smith, 42, pitcher for the 1913 Cincinnati Reds.
October 12 – Ray Treadaway, 27, third baseman who played with the Washington Senators during the 1930 season.
October 19 – Walt Doan, 48,  pitcher for the Cleveland Naps in 1909 and 1910.
October 22 – Tommy Tucker, 71, first baseman for the Baltimore Orioles, Boston Beaneaters, Washington Senators, Brooklyn Bridebrooms, St. Louis Browns, and Cleveland Spiders between 1887 and 1899, who led the American Association hitters in 1889 with a .372 average.
October 30 – Steve Brodie, 67, outfielder and a .303 career hitter for the Beaneaters, Browns, Orioles, Pirates and Giants during 11 seasons spanning 1890–1902.

November
November 6 – Billy Sunday, 72, popular outfielder in the National League during the 1880s, who became the most celebrated and influential American evangelist during the first two decades of the 20th century.
November 9 – Rex DeVogt, 47, backup catcher for the Boston Braves during the 1913 season.
November 13 – Frank Navin, 64, owner of the Detroit Tigers since 1908 who assembled the American League pennant-winning clubs of 1907, 1908, 1909 and 1934, as well as the 1935 World Series champion team.
November 17 – Carl Cashion, 44, pitcher for the Washington Senators from 1911 to 1914.

December
December 8 – Baldy Louden, 52, second baseman/shortstop for the New York Highlanders (1907), Detroit Tigers (1912–1913) and Cincinnati Reds (1920), who enjoyed his greatest success while playing with the Buffalo Buffeds/Blues of the Federal League, when he ranked among the top-ten in several offensive categories in the 1914 and 1915 seasons.
December 17 – Charlie Atherton, 62, third baseman for the 1899 Washington Senators of the National League.
December 21 – Cy Rigler, 53, National League umpire since 1906, who worked in ten World Series, the first All-Star game, and is regarded by creating arm signals for balls and strikes count.
December 28 – Jack Corcoran, 77, catcher for the 1884 Brooklyn Atlantics.
December 29 – Harley Payne, 67, pitcher who played from 1896 through 1899 for the Brooklyn Bridegrooms and the Pittsburgh Pirates.

References